The 1999 Mississippi gubernatorial election took place on November 2, 1999 to elect the Governor of Mississippi.  Incumbent Governor Kirk Fordice, a member of the Republican Party who had been first elected in 1991, was ineligible to run for reelection due to term limits.

In the general election, Democrat Lieutenant Governor Ronnie Musgrove won a plurality of the vote over Republican Congressman Mike Parker.  Per the Mississippi Constitution, since no candidate had received a majority of the vote, the election was decided by the Mississippi House of Representatives in a contingent election. On January 4, 2000, the House voted 86-36, which was nearly along partisan lines, to elect Musgrove governor. As to date, this remains the last time a Democrat was elected Governor of Mississippi.

Democratic primary
Lieutenant Governor Ronnie Musgrove won the Democratic primary, defeating former Commissioner of Public Safety Jim Roberts and 5 other candidates.

Results

Republican primary
Former U.S. Representative Michael Parker won the Republican primary, defeating former Lieutenant Governor Eddie Briggs and four other candidates.

Results

General election

Results
Under the 1890 Constitution of Mississippi, gubernatorial candidates must win a majority of the popular vote. In addition, the Mississippi House of Representatives acts as an electoral college; a candidate must win both a majority of the vote and a majority of the state house districts to be elected.

With neither candidate winning the required popular and electoral majority, the House of Representatives, where the Democrats had a supermajority at the time, decided between the two candidates with the highest popular vote. Parker refused to concede, and the House elected Musgrove 86-36 along partisan lines.

References

1999
gubernatorial
Mississippi